Carbonyl bromide, also known as bromophosgene by analogy to phosgene, is an organic chemical compound. It is a carbon oxohalide. Carbonyl bromide is a decomposition product of halon compounds used in fire extinguishers.

Synthesis and reactions
Carbonyl bromide is formed by the oxidation carbon tetrabromide with sulfuric acid:

In contrast to phosgene, carbonyl bromide cannot be produced efficiently by halogenation of carbon monoxide. The bromination of carbon monoxide follows this equation:

But the process is slow at room temperature. Increasing temperature, in order to increase the reaction rate, results in a further shift of the chemical equilibrium towards the educts (since ΔRH < 0 and ΔRS < 0).

Carbonyl bromide slowly decomposes to carbon monoxide and elemental bromine even at low temperatures. It is also sensitive to hydrolysis, breaking down into hydrogen bromide and carbon dioxide.

References

Carbonyl compounds
Oxobromides
Carbon oxohalides